Cheyenne Roller Derby is a women's flat track roller derby league based in Cheyenne, Wyoming. Founded in 2010, the league consists of two travel teams, which compete against teams from other leagues. Cheyenne is a member of the Women's Flat Track Derby Association (WFTDA).

The Capidolls remained undefeated for more than a year.  The league attracted attention by raising money for the local animal shelter, and undertaking voluntary work, such as planting flowers in the city's downtown area.

The league was accepted into the Women's Flat Track Derby Association Apprentice Program in January 2012, and became a full member of the WFTDA in September 2012 - the first from Wyoming.

WFTDA rankings

 NR = no end-of-year ranking assigned

References

Roller derby leagues in Wyoming
Organizations based in Cheyenne, Wyoming
Women's Flat Track Derby Association Division 3
Roller derby leagues established in 2010
2010 establishments in Wyoming
Sports in Cheyenne, Wyoming